The Primavera Sound 2018 was held on 28 May to 3 June 2018 at the Parc del Fòrum, Barcelona, Spain. The festival was preceded by the event, Primavera a la Ciutat, which was located in the downtown Barcelona.

The headliners were Björk, Nick Cave and the Bad Seeds, The National, and Arctic Monkeys.

Lineup
Headline performers are listed in boldface. Artists listed from latest to earliest set times.

Seat

Mango

Primavera with Apple Music

Ray-Ban

Pitchfork

Adidas Originals

Auditori Rockdelux

Night Pro

Heineken Hidden Stage

The Warehouse

Radio Primavera Sound

Primavera a la Ciutat lineup

Sala Apolo

La [2] de Apolo

Barts Club

Day Pro

Barcelona

Sala Teatre

L'Auditori

Primavera Bits lineup

Bacardí Live

Desperados Club

Xiringuito Aperol

Notes

References

2018 music festivals
Music festivals in Spain
Primavera Sound